Pytchley is a village and civil parish in Northamptonshire, England, three miles south-west of Kettering and near the A14 road. At the time of the 2011 census, the parish's population was 489 people. The village has a Church of England Primary School, a church and a pub. The Pytchley Hunt is a famous fox hunt based near the village.

The village's name means 'wood/clearing of Peoht'.

The village lost its bus service in 2018.

References

External links

Village website

Villages in Northamptonshire
Civil parishes in Northamptonshire
North Northamptonshire